Malleolus (plural: malleoli) is a fan-shaped chemoreceptor or racquet organ, an array of which are carried in pairs on the ventral or undersides of Solpugidae. They are the counterpart of pectines in scorpions, and modified walking limbs in the uropygids and amblypygids. Most species have 5 pairs of malleoli on the ventral surface of the fourth pair of legs of both sexes, while juveniles and other species have 2-3 pairs.

A malleolus comprises a basal stalk and a triangular fan, with epicuticular protrusions on each anterior face, and granular structures on each stalk, with undulate surfaces at each distal end.

Literature

Babu, K. 1965. Anatomy of the central nervous system of arachnids. Zoologische Jahrbücher, Anatomie und Ontogenie 82: 1–154.
Bernard, H. M. 1896. The comparative morphology of the Galeodidae. Transactions of the Linnean Society. 2d Series. Zoology 6: 305–417.
Brownell, P. H. and R. D. Farley. 1974. The organization of the malleolar sensory system in the solpugid, Chanbria sp. Tissue & Cell 6: 471–485. CrossRef, PubMed
Harvey, M. S. 2003. Catalogue of the Smaller Arachnid Orders of the World. CSIRO Publishing, Collingwood Victoria, Australia.
Koç, H. 2007. The solifuges (Arachnida: Solpugida) fauna of southeast Anatolia: systematic zoogeography and ecology, PhD thesis, Ege University, İzmir, 241 pp. [in Turkish]

Punzo, F. 1998. The Biology of Camel-spiders (Arachnida, Solifugae). Kluwer Academic Publishers, Boston, MA. 301 pp. CrossRef
Ruhlemann, H. 1908. Uber die Facherorgane, sog. Malleoli oder Raquettes coxales, des vierten Beinpaares der Solpugiden. Zeitschrift fr wissenschaftliche Zoologie 91: 599–639.
Nazife Yiğit, Melek Erdek, Halil Koç, and Abdullah Melekoğlu. 2011. Morphological Comparison of the Malleoli (Racquet Organs) in Biton zederbaueri and Gluviopsilla discolor (Daesiidae, Solifugae)

References

Arthropod anatomy
Sensory receptors